Federico Barrandeguy Martino (born 8 May 1996) is a Uruguayan footballer who plays as a defender for Plaza Colonia.

References

External links

1996 births
Living people
Montevideo Wanderers F.C. players
Club Plaza Colonia de Deportes players
Botafogo de Futebol e Regatas players
Uruguayan Primera División players
Campeonato Brasileiro Série A players
Uruguayan expatriate sportspeople in Brazil
Expatriate footballers in Brazil
Uruguayan footballers
Association football defenders